Systremma is a genus of moths of the family Erebidae. The genus was erected by Gottlieb August Wilhelm Herrich-Schäffer in 1858.

Species
Systremma crassicornis Herrich-Schäffer, [1858] Brazil (Rio de Janeiro)
Systremma ennomodes Hampson, 1926 Colombia
Systremma peruviensis (Dognin, 1912) Peru, Ecuador

References

Calpinae